Dicerca caudata is a species of metallic wood-boring beetle in the family Buprestidae. It is found in North America.

References

Further reading

 
 
 

Buprestidae
Beetles of North America
Beetles described in 1860
Taxa named by John Lawrence LeConte
Articles created by Qbugbot